Lisa-Paule Wengler (born 25 May 1992) is a Luxembourgian footballer who plays for the Luxembourg women's national football team. She made her debut on 20 March 2013 against Estonia.

References

External links
 Bitburg player profile

1992 births
Living people
Luxembourgian women's footballers
Place of birth missing (living people)
Luxembourg women's international footballers
Women's association footballers not categorized by position